Montefortino is a comune (municipality) in the Province of Fermo in the Italian region Marche, located about  south of Ancona, about  northwest of Ascoli Piceno and about  west of Fermo.  

Montefortino borders the following municipalities: Amandola, Bolognola, Castelsantangelo sul Nera, Comunanza, Montemonaco, Sarnano, Ussita, Visso.

The city art collection is housed in the Pinacoteca Civica Fortunato Duranti.

References

Cities and towns in the Marche